Lebanon Township is an inactive township in Laclede County, in the U.S. state of Missouri.

Lebanon Township was erected in 1849, taking its name from the community of Lebanon, Missouri.

References

Townships in Missouri
Townships in Laclede County, Missouri